Maximum Balloon is the debut solo studio album by American musician and record producer David Andrew Sitek of TV on the Radio, under the moniker Maximum Balloon. It was released on September 21, 2010, by DGC Records and Interscope Records. The album was placed at number 24 on Rolling Stones list of the 30 Best Albums of 2010.

Track listing

Charts

References

2010 debut albums
Albums produced by Dave Sitek
DGC Records albums
Interscope Records albums